Micere Githae Mugo (born Madeleine Micere Githae in 1942) is a playwright, author, activist, instructor and poet from Kenya. She is a literary critic and professor of literature in the Department of African American Studies at Syracuse University. She was forced into exile in 1982 from Kenya during the Daniel Arap Moi dictatorship for activism and moved to teach in Zimbabwe, and later the United States. Mwalimu Mugo teaches Orature, Literature, and Creative Writing. Her publications include six books, a play co-authored with Ngũgĩ wa Thiong'o and three monographs. She has also edited journals and the Zimbabwean school curriculum. The East African Standard listed her among the 100 most influential people in Kenya in 2002.

Early life
Mugo was born in 1942, in Baricho, Kirinyaga District, Kenya. The daughter of two progressive (liberal) teachers who were politically active in Kenya's fight for independence, she received a solid primary and secondary education in Kenya, attending Alliance Girls High School. She became one of the first black students to be allowed to enroll in what had previously been a segregated academy. She later attended Makerere University (where she gained her B.A. in 1966), the University of New Brunswick (gaining her M.A. in 1973) and University of Toronto (where she gained her PhD in 1978). She took up a teaching position at the University of Nairobi in 1973, and in 1978 or 1980 became Dean of the Faculty of Arts, making her the first female faculty dean in Kenya. She taught at the University of Nairobi until 1982, and has also taught at the University of Zimbabwe.

Exile
Mugo was a political activist who fought against human rights abuses in Kenya. Her political activism led to her being harassed by the police and arrested. Mugo and her family (including two young daughters) were forced to depart Kenya in 1982 after the attempted coup of the Daniel Arap Moi government after which she became a target of official government harassment. She was stripped of her Kenyan citizenship but was given Zimbabwean citizenship. She has worked, written, and taught from abroad since she left Kenya. Since 1984 she has been a citizen of Zimbabwe. Mwalimu Mugo has said:

Late career
Mugo is the founder and President of the Pan African Community of Central New York where she initiated volunteer programs in two prisons. She has been an official speaker for Amnesty International and a consultant for the "Africa on the Horizon" series by Blackside. Currently she is a consultant for many foundations, and on the board of many journals. She also served as chairperson of the board of directors of SARIPS, the Southern Africa Regional Institute for Policy Studies in Harare. She is currently a lecturer in Pan-African Studies at Syracuse University, where she continues her activism and writing. She has been quoted as saying:

In 2021, the Royal African Society presented Mugo with the Lifetime Achievement award in African Literature, the first recipient having been Margaret Busby in 2019.

Works
Mugo is a distinguished poet, and the author or editor of 15 books. Her work is generally from a traditional African, Pan-African and feminist perspective, and draws heavily upon indigenous African cultural traditions. She has also collaborated with the Zimbabwean writer Shimmer Chinodya in editing plays and stories for adolescents in Shona.

Plays
The Long Illness of Ex-Chief Kiti, East African Literature Bureau, 1976
The Trial of Dedan Kimathi (co-authored with Ngũgĩ wa Thiong'o), Heinemann, 1976

Poetry
Daughter of My People, Sing!, East African Literature Bureau, 1976
My Mother's Song and Other Poems, East African Educational Publishers, 1994

Literary criticism
Visions of Africa: The Fiction of Chinua Achebe, Margaret Laurence, Elspeth Huxley, and Ngũgĩ wa Thiong'o, Kenya Literature Bureau, 1978
African Orature and Human Rights, National University of Lesotho, 1991
The imperative of Utu / Ubuntu in Africana scholarship, Daraja Press, 2021

Autobiography
Writing & Speaking from the Heart of My Mind, Africa World Press, 2012

Awards and honours

Marcus Garvey Award from the Canadian Branch of UNIA – 1985.
Ford Foundation Award for research on African orature and human rights – 1987–90.
Rockefeller Foundation Award for writing and publication – 1992.
Human Rights Award, Onondaga County Human Rights Commission – 2004.
Beyond Community Recognition Awards, Inc. – 2004.
Lifetime Community Service Award (CNY Women Syracuse Chapter).
CNY Women of Distinction Award – 2008.
President of United Women of Africa.
Courage Award, Girl Scout Council of Central New York.
Distinguished Africanist Scholar Award – 2007.
"The Top 100: They Influenced Kenya Most during the 20th Century", East African Standard – 2002.
Royal African Society Lifetime Achievement Award in African Literature – 2021.

TV appearances
 International World Peace Summit – 2006 C-SPAN (Panelist)

Relatives
She has two well-known siblings in Kenya: former Chief Nursing Officer Eunice Muringo Kiereini and the politician Robinson Njeru Githae. Their father was Solomon Githendui Githae (1904–2007).

References

External links
"My Mother's Poem and Other Songs,Song and Poems", Barnes & Noble.

1942 births
20th-century Kenyan women writers
Alumni of Alliance Girls High School
Kenyan activists
Kenyan dramatists and playwrights
Kenyan essayists
Kenyan feminists
Kenyan novelists
Kenyan philosophers
Kenyan poets
Kenyan prisoners and detainees
Kenyan women activists
Kenyan women essayists
Kenyan women novelists
Kenyan women poets
Kenyan women writers
Living people
Makerere University alumni
Syracuse University faculty
Women dramatists and playwrights